The Wimmera Football League is a major Australian rules country league based in Western Victoria, with clubs located in towns in the Wimmera region: the regional centres along the Western Highway from Ararat to Nhill as well as Minyip-Murtoa and Warracknabeal.

History
A Wimmera Football Association was first formed in 1902, with teams from Ararat, Horsham and Stawell as the founding clubs. In 1921 the Wimmera District Football League was formed. The seven original clubs were Ararat, Horsham, Minyip, Murtoa, Rupanyup, Stawell and Warracknabael. Dimboola joined in 1923 and Nhill in 1925; Ararat spent six years in the Ballarat Football League from 1924 to 1929.

In 1932, during the height of the Great Depression, the small town clubs were suffering from financial pressures, and tried to get the league to change the way the gate taking were distributed to the clubs. The larger town clubs, knowing that they would be disadvantaged, blocked the motion. Subsequently, Nhill and Dimboola both went into recess while Minyip and Murtoa replaced their junior sides in the Dunmunkle FL.

The WDFL approached the Ballarat Football League to merge hoping that greater interest and better football would cause larger gate takings, so in 1934 the Wimmera FL and the Ballarat FL merged to form the Ballarat Wimmera FL. After three years, in which the Wimmera clubs faced with greater costs and were constantly losing on the field, feelers were put out to the smaller clubs, now playing in the Mid Wimmera FL. A peace deal was settled in September 1936 and the Wimmera Football League was reformed in 1937 as a nine team competition.

After WWII Rupanyup decided to join and that made it a ten team competition. As a ten team competition the league remain stable until Rupanyip decided the level of football was too hard for them and they opted to drop to the local district competition in 1981. The numbers returned to ten when local district club Imperials-Wonwondah joined in 1983. After fifty fruitless years Jeparit decided to try their luck in the South Mallee FL from 1990.
St Michaels from the district competition joined in 1993.  Founding clubs Minyip and Murtoa decided to merge in 1995. 

2000 saw local Horsham clubs change their names, St Michaels became Horsham Saints and Imperials-Wonwondah became the Horsham Diggers.

Horsham Diggers later merged with Natimuk FNC under the banner Natimuk United at the start of 2014; following an exodus of players in the 2008 pre-season, the Diggers had struggled on and off-field, and had won three matches in the previous four seasons. The merged club plays home games at Natimuk and City Oval.

Southern Mallee transferred from the Hosham District League in 2018 after dominating the competition.

Clubs

Current

Former clubs

List of premiers
Wimmera District FL

	1920	Ararat
	1921	Warracknabeal
	1922	Minyip
	1923	Warracknabeal
	1924	Horsham
	1925	Stawell
	1926	Stawell
	1927	Warracknabeal
	1928	Dimboola
	1929	Dimboola
	1930	Stawell
	1931	Stawell
	1932	Horsham
	1933	Stawell
Wimmera Football League
	1937	Dimboola
	1938	Horsham
	1939	Stawell
	1940	Stawell
	1941-1944 No play WWII
Wimmera Patriotic Football League		
	1945	Warracknabeal
Wimmera Football League
	1946	Dimboola

	1947	Warracknabeal
	1948	Stawell
	1949	Ararat
	1950	Stawell
	1951	Ararat
	1952	Minyip
	1953	Warracknabeal
	1954	Minyip
	1955	Ararat
	1956	Ararat
	1957	Ararat
	1958	Ararat
	1959	Dimboola
	1960	Horsham
	1961	Rupanyup
	1962	Horsham
	1963	Rupanyup
	1964	Nhill
	1965	Nhill
	1966	Warracknabeal
	1967	Horsham
	1968	Horsham
	1969	Nhill
	1970	Horsham

	1971	Ararat
	1972	Horsham
	1973	Rupanyup
	1974	Horsham
	1975	Ararat
	1976	Horsham
	1977	Warracknabeal
	1978	Stawell
	1979	Horsham
	1980	Murtoa
	1981	Nhill
	1982	Horsham
	1983	Horsham
	1984	Minyip
	1985	Dimboola
	1986	Ararat
	1987	Stawell
	1988	United
	1989	Horsham
	1990	Horsham
	1991	Minyip
	1992	Minyip
	1993	Minyip
	1994	Warracknabeal

	1995	Stawell
	1996	Minyip-Murtoa
	1997	Minyip-Murtoa
	1998	Minyip-Murtoa
	1999	Ararat
	2000	Stawell
	2001	Ararat
	2002	Warrack Eagles
	2003	Horsham
	2004	Horsham
	2005	Horsham
	2006	Horsham
	2007	Horsham
	2008	Horsham
	2009	Horsham
	2010	Horsham
	2011	Horsham
	2012	Horsham
	2013	Dimboola
	2014	Horsham
	2015	Horsham Saints
	2016	Horsham Saints
	2017	Horsham
	2018	Horsham
	2019	Minyip Murtoa
       2020 League in recess due to COVID19 pandemic 
	2022	Minyip Murtoa

VFL/AFL players

 Larry Watson - , 
 Ernest Mucklow - Port Adelaide
 Jack Baggott - Richmond
 Doug Wade - , 
 Merv Neagle - , 
 Tim Watson - 
 Luke Brennan - , 
 Roy Cazaly - , 
 Clinton Young - 
  Seb Ross - 
 Jake Lloyd -

2005 Ladder

2006 Ladder

2007 Ladder

2008 Ladder

2009 Ladder

2010 Ladder

2011 Ladder

2012 Ladder

2013 Ladder

2014 Ladder

2015 Ladder

2016 Ladder

2017 Ladder

2018 Ladder

Publication
Wheatbelt Warriors. A Tribute To Wimmera Football League.

References

External links 

League website
History of Ararat FC

 
Australian rules football competitions in Victoria (Australia)